Andressa Karolaine Freire Gomes (born 2 August 1999), commonly known as Kaká, is a Brazilian footballer who plays as a centre back for Santos.

Club career
Born in Brasília, Federal District, Kaká began her career with local side  in 2016, as a forward. Promoted to the first team in 2018, she was a first-choice as the side won the year's Campeonato Brasileiro de Futebol Feminino Série A2.

She remained as a starter for Minas in the following years, suffering relegation from the Campeonato Brasileiro de Futebol Feminino Série A1 in 2021. On 4 February 2022, she moved to Santos.

On 21 November 2022, Kaká renewed her contract with Santos for a further year.

Honours
Minas Brasília
Campeonato Brasileiro de Futebol Feminino Série A2: 2018

References

1999 births
Living people
Sportspeople from Brasília
Brazilian footballers
Brazilian women's footballers
Women's association football defenders
Campeonato Brasileiro de Futebol Feminino Série A1 players
Santos FC (women) players